The 1938 St. Louis Browns season involved the Browns finishing 7th in the American League with a record of 55 wins and 97 losses.

Offseason 
 December 1, 1937: Elon Hogsett was traded by the Browns to the Washington Senators for Ed Linke.
 December 2, 1937: Joe Vosmik was traded by the Browns to the Boston Red Sox for Red Kress, Buster Mills and Bobo Newsom.

Regular season

Season standings

Record vs. opponents

Opening Day lineup 
 Mel Mazzera, LF
 Billy Sullivan Jr., C
 Sam West, CF
 Beau Bell, 3B
 Harlond Clift, 3B
 Red Kress, SS
 George McQuinn, 1B
 Don Heffner, 2B
 Bobo Newsom, P

Notable transactions 
 June 11, 1938: Jack Knott was traded by the Browns to the Chicago White Sox in exchange for Bill Cox.
 September 8, 1938: Joe Grace was purchased by the Browns from the Memphis Chicks (Southern Association).

Roster

Player stats

Batting

Starters by position 
Note: Pos = Position; G = Games played; AB = At bats; H = Hits; Avg. = Batting average; HR = Home runs; RBI = Runs batted in

Other batters 
Note: G = Games played; AB = At bats; H = Hits; Avg. = Batting average; HR = Home runs; RBI = Runs batted in

Pitching

Starting pitchers 
Note: G = Games pitched; IP = Innings pitched; W = Wins; L = Losses; ERA = Earned run average; SO = Strikeouts

Other pitchers 
Note: G = Games pitched; IP = Innings pitched; W = Wins; L = Losses; ERA = Earned run average; SO = Strikeouts

Relief pitchers 
Note: G = Games pitched; W = Wins; L = Losses; SV = Saves; ERA = Earned run average; SO = Strikeouts

Farm system

References

External links 
1938 St. Louis Browns team page at Baseball Reference
1938 St. Louis Browns season at baseball-almanac.com

St. Louis Browns seasons
Saint Louis Browns season
St Louis Browns